National Peace Corps Association is an American nonprofit organization for future, current, and returned Peace Corps Volunteers, former Peace Corps staff, host country counterparts, and family and friends of the Peace Corps. It works to support the Peace Corps community, encourage lifelong practice of the ideals of the Peace Corps, and serves as an advocacy organization to support, expand, and improve the Peace Corps.

Overview
Founded in 1979 and headquartered in Washington, D.C., National Peace Corps Association (NPCA) is a nonprofit organization at the center of a vibrant and united community of 215,000 individuals who share the Peace Corps experience. The NPCA champions a lifelong commitment to Peace Corps ideals by connecting, engaging and promoting its members and affiliate groups as they continue to make a difference in communities in the U.S. and around the world. NPCA is also dedicated to advocating for, contributing to, and supporting the betterment of the Peace Corps.

NPCA encompasses a network of over 180 member groups. NPCA and its affiliates produce global education programs and advocacy campaigns, and provide community, national, and international services. It is governed by a board of directors and managed by a professional staff. NPCA is separate from the United States Peace Corps, which is a federal agency.

History
At conferences of global educators in the Midwest in the mid-1970s, a handful of Returned Peace Corps Volunteers began meeting regularly to discuss how to promote at home the values and lessons they had learned as Peace Corps Volunteers in the developing world. They adopted as their mission one of the three goals articulated by President John F. Kennedy when he created the Peace Corps in 1961: come home and teach your neighbors about the communities where you served. They gave the growing numbers of returning Peace Corps Volunteers in America a continuing mission and a communal identity as Returned Peace Corps Volunteers (RPCVs).

In 1979, these global educators joined with leaders of communities of RPCVs in New York and Washington, D.C. to create the National Council of Returned Peace Corps Volunteers (incorporated 1981). In 1993, the name was changed to the more inclusive National Peace Corps Association (NPCA).

Upon their return from overseas, RPCVs and former staff continue to receive recognition from several organizations. 120,000 RPCVs accepted the Beyond War Award in 1987 in honor of their commitment to nonviolence. Through their participation in volunteer projects or other endeavors, many RPCVs remain active in the Peace Corps community today.  NPCA has encouraged and recognized outstanding service by members of the Peace Corps community by awarding over 20 Sargent Shriver Awards for Distinguished Humanitarian Service. NPCA also recognizes affiliate group achievements with the Loret Miller Ruppe Award for Outstanding Community Service that honors outstanding community service in the US and the world.

In response to the 1994 genocide in Rwanda, NPCA created the Emergency Response Network (ERN) of Returned Peace Corps Volunteers willing to respond to crises when needed.  Peace Corps Director Mark Gearan subsequently modeled the Crisis Corps (later renamed Peace Corps Response)  after this successful program.

In 2002, NPCA was nominated for the Nobel Peace Prize, along with the Peace Corps.

Members of our organization continue to testify on Peace Corps legislation and key issues like safety and security, and our 2003 advocacy campaign helped garner the largest appropriation ever in Peace Corps history: $308 million for FY2004, plus another $15 million for Peace Corps HIV/ AIDS activities.

In 2005 NPCA scored a crucial and significant victory for the independence of the Peace Corps and safety of Volunteers when it successfully coordinated the removal of Peace Corps references from military recruitment legislation.

In coordination with the Returned Peace Corps Volunteers of Washington, D.C., NPCA organized 200 Returned Peace Corps Volunteers to march in President Barack Obama’s Inaugural Parade on January 20, 2009.

NPCA has played an important advisory role to Returned Peace Corps Volunteers seeking the return of Peace Corps programs to their countries of service, as in the recent cases of Sierra Leone and Indonesia.

In 2009, National Peace Corps Association launched Peace Corps Connect', a website and online social networking platform to help current and Returned Peace Corps Volunteers connect with each other and share ideas about projects, events, careers, and advocacy issues.

Conferences 
Throughout its history, the NPCA has endeavored to hold an annual event, ranging from large conferences and celebrations for major Peace Corps anniversaries to annual general meetings to satisfy bylaws requirements.

Oct. 1978 — Omaha, Nebraska (Red Lion Hotel) This gathering predates the founding of NPCA

Oct. 1979 — Omaha, Nebraska (Red Lion Hotel) This gathering is marked as the founding of NPCA, when the bylaws were formalized and signed by the charter members.

Oct. 1980 — Omaha, Nebraska (Red Lion Hotel)

1981 — Washington, DC (20th Anniversary of Peace Corps; the first of the major PC anniversary conferences and always held in Washington, DC; Red Lion Hotel)

June 1982 — Los Angeles, CA (University of California-Los Angeles)

1983 — Denver, CO (Denver University)

1984 — Boston, MA (Emmanuel College)

1985 — Atlanta, GA (Georgia Tech)

July 1986 — San Antonio, TX (Trinity College)

Sept. 1986 —Washington, DC (25th Anniversary of Peace Corps; held on the Mall)

1987 — Madison, WI (University of Wisconsin-Madison)

1988 — Boulder, CO (University of Colorado)

1989 — Kent, OH (Kent State University)

1990 — Eugene, OR (University of Oregon and Hilton Hotel)

Aug. 1991 — Washington, DC (30th Anniversary of Peace Corps; held on the Mall)

1992 — Fayetteville, AR (University of Arkansas-Fayetteville)

1993 — Berkeley CA (University of California-Berkeley)

1994 — Atlanta, GA (CNN Center and Omni Atlanta Hotel)

1995 — Austin, TX (University of Texas-Austin)

Mar. 1–3, 1996 — Washington, DC (35th Anniversary of Peace Corps; Mayflower Hotel)

1996 — Shawnee-on-Delaware, PA (Resort Hotel)

July 10–13, 1997 — San Diego, CA (Town & Country Hotel and Conference Center)

1998 — Columbus, OH (The Ohio State University)

1999 — St. Paul, MN (University of Saint Thomas)

Aug. 11–13, 2000 — Shawnee-on-Delaware (Resort Hotel)

Sept. 21, 2001 — Planned for Washington, DC, canceled because of attacks on World Trade Center and Pentagon

June 20–23, 2002 — Washington, DC (40th+1 Anniversary of Peace Corps; Onmi Shoreham Hotel)

Aug. 1–3, 2003 — Portland, OR (University Place Hotel and Conference Center)

Aug. 5–8, 2004 — Chicago, IL (Palmer House Hilton)

2005 — Annual General Meeting in Washington, DC

Sept. 14–16, 2006 — Washington, DC (45th Anniversary of Peace Corps)

June 30, 2007 — Annual General Meeting in Washington, DC

Oct. 3–4, 2008 — San Francisco, CA (Jewish Community Center)

June 30, 2009 — Annual General Meeting in Washington, DC

June 26, 2010 — Annual General Meeting in Washington, DC

Sept. 21–25, 2011 — Washington, DC (50th Anniversary of Peace Corps, Georgetown University, National Theater, Ronald Reagan Building)

June 27–July 1, 2012 — Minneapolis, MN (Minneapolis Convention Center)

June 26–29, 2013 — Boston, MA (Harvard University Medical School)

June 20–21, 2014 — Nashville, TN (Vanderbilt University and Country Music Hall of Fame)

June 4–6, 2015 — Berkeley, CA (University of California-Berkeley)

Sept. 21–25, 2016 — Washington, DC (55th Anniversary of Peace Corps; George Washington University)

August 4–6, 2017 — Denver, CO (University of Denver)

August 23–25, 2018 — Shawnee-on-Delaware, PA (Resort)

June 20–22, 2019 – Austin, TX (University of Texas-Austin)

Sept. 26, 2020 – Virtual Ideas Summit: "Peace Corps Connect to the Future"

Sept. 23–25, 2021 — Washington, DC (60th Anniversary of Peace Corps) Virtual Conference

Presidents’ Forum meetings for affiliated group leaders were held in conjunction with each annual meeting beginning in 1990 at the Kent State University. This event changed title to Group Leaders’ Forum at the 2005 annual meeting in Washington, DC.

Publications
WorldView, a magazine of news and comments about the Peace Corps world, is published four times a year by NPCA. Each issue provides a Peace Corps perspective to global issues by featuring articles by and about Peace Corps Volunteers, Returned Peace Corps Volunteers and people who "share the global values of the Peace Corps experience".

Programs
Peace Corps Connect is the annual conference of the Peace Corps community. The 2014 event was held in Nashville, Tennessee from June 19–21, 2014.  The 2015 will be co-hosted with the Northern California Peace Corps Association in Berkeley, California in early June.

Africa rural connect is an online global collaboration project to solve rural Africa's greatest challenges. It enables Africans, Peace Corps Volunteers, and anyone else with a connection to Sub-Saharan Africa to add their voice and build upon the ideas of others. The ARC Project introduces and encourages a new form of collaboration in order to identify creative, new plans to deal with the fundamental problems of agricultural development and rural poverty in Sub-Saharan Africa. With the technology, motivation and experience, the more people that get involved, the more creative the plans will become, and the greater exposure of the best ideas to improve development. The online contest will jump-start ideas which will form practical plans that, in turn, may gain public exposure, influence public policy and perhaps win financial support for implementation. The project aims to face the real needs, identify problems and take action with practical, timely, cost-effective local solutions. The best action plan wins a grand prize, including opportunities to meet with leaders in the development community to discuss bringing those ideas to life.

RPCV Mentoring Program assists returning volunteers with their transition from Peace Corps service. The program's fundamental goal is to connect recently returned Peace Corps Volunteers with RPCV mentors one year after close of service. These mentors help ease the difficult transition and provide a connection to the RPCV community at large, adding a level of comfort. They supply advice, key networking contacts, share experiences and adjustment issues, offer guidance on further education, review resumes, assist with career planning and promote the many resources available to RPCVs in an effort to transition them from serving abroad to serving at home.

E-Newsletter
National Peace Corps Association produces a number of electronic newsletters to connect, inform and engage the Peace Corps community. All three are open to the public to subscribe.

NPCA News is sent on the third Thursday of each month (except August).

GlobalEdNews is sent one to three times a month (except during the summer) to anyone interested in bringing global issues into classrooms and communities

NPCA Advocacy is sent periodically with action alerts and the latest news on legislation affecting the Peace Corps community.

Affiliate Groups
Over 180 affiliate groups form the grassroots network of NPCA. Groups may be geographic (such as Chicago Area Peace Corps Association), based on the country of Peace Corps service (such as Friends of Guatemala), associated with workplaces (such as RPCVs at USAID), driven by social action (such as Peace Corps Community for Refugees), or defined by affinity (such as the Peace Corps Oral History Project). Groups promote global education, provide services in their communities and work with Peace Corps recruiting offices to support recently returned Peace Corps volunteers. Many support development projects overseas, and they sponsor forums and publications for information and issue discussions.

Country of Service Groups

-A-
Afghanistan,
Armenia

-B-
Baltics,
Belize,
Benin,
Bolivia,
Botswana,
Bulgaria,
Burkina Faso

-C-
Cameroon,
China,
Colombia,
Congo (Zaire),
Costa Rica,
Côte d'Ivoire

-D-
Dominican Republic
	
-E-
Eastern Caribbean,
Ecuador,
El Salvador,
Eritrea,
Ethiopia

-F-
Fiji

-G-
Gabon,
Gambia,
Georgia,
Ghana,
Guatemala,
Guinea,
Guyana

-H-
Honduras

-I-
India,
Iran

-J-
Jamaica,
Jordan

-K-
Kenya,
Korea,
Kyrgyzstan

-L-
Lesotho,
Liberia

-M-
Macedonia,
Malawi,
Malaysia,
Mauritania,
Micronesia,
Mongolia,
Morocco
	
-N-
Nepal,
Niger,
Nigeria

-P-
Pakistan,
Panama,
Paraguay,
Peru,
Philippines

-R-
Romania

-S-
Samoa,
Senegal,
Sierra Leone,
Swaziland
	
-T-
Tanzania,
Thailand,
Togo,
Turkey,
Turkmenistan

-U-
Uganda,
Ukraine

-Z-
Zimbabwe

Geographic Groups

-A-
Anchorage AK,
Fairbanks AK,
Birmingham AL,
Phoenix AZ,
Tucson AZ

-B-
Boston MA

-C-
Los Angeles CA,
Northern CA,
Orange County CA,
Sacramento CA,
San Diego CA,
Santa Barbara CA,
Inland Southern CA, 
Ventura County CA,
Denver CO,
Connecticut

-D-
Delaware,
District of Columbia

-F-
First Coast FL,
North FL,
South FL

-G-
Atlanta GA

-H-
Honolulu HI

-I-
Idaho,
Chicago IL,
Northeastern IL,
Central Indiana,
Iowa
	
-K-
Kansas City Area,
South KS,
Kentucky - Statewide,
KY/IN-Kentuckiana

-L-
Louisiana

-M-
Maryland,
Boston MA,
Central MO,
Kansas City MO,
Southeastern MI,
West MI,
Minnesota,
Saint Louis MO,
Big Sky MT,
Western MT

-N-
Nebraska,
New Jersey,
Southern Nevada,
New Mexico,
Charlotte NC,
North Carolina,
Western NC,
Wilmington NC,
Winston-Salem NC,
Long Island NY,
New York NY,
Northeast NY,
Rochester NY,
Western NY

-O-
Athens OH,
Central OH,
Cincinnati OH,
Northern OH,
Southwestern OH,
Oklahoma,
Eugene OR,
Portland OR

-P-
Bethlehem PA,
Philadelphia PA

-R-
Rhode Island

-T-
Austin TX,
Dallas/Fort Worth TX,
Houston TX,
San Antonio TX

-V-
Vermont,
Hampton Roads VA

-W-
Inland Northwest (ID/WA),
Seattle WA,
Madison WI,
Milwaukee WI

Nationwide Groups
 Lesbian, Gay and Bisexual RPCVs

References

External links

 Peace Corps Volunteers Papers Numerical List, National Anthropological Archives, Smithsonian Institution

Association
1979 establishments in the United States